Electric Light Orchestra Part Two is the debut album by ELO Part II, released in 1991. In March 1991, lead single "Honest Men" charted at number 60 on the UK Singles Chart, and 36 on the Dutch Top 40 chart. The track "Kiss Me Red" is a cover of the theme to the short-lived TV series Dreams.

The album would later be reissued in 1991 as Part Two: Once Upon a Time. The album would be reissued again in 2021 by Renaissance Records on CD and LP, with the CD release including bonus tracks.

Background 
After Electric Light Orchestra (ELO) was disbanded in 1986, Bev Bevan approached Jeff Lynne to record another album, Lynne declined. So in 1989 Bev Bevan formed a new band with a new lineup under ELO, however Lynne objected to the use of ELO's name. After a lawsuit a compromise was reached, the new name of the band would be ELO Part II. In addition to the new name Lynne would also receive a share of royalties from ELO Part II's sales.

Reception

In 1991, Music & Media magazine declared in their review that ELO part II …"have succeeded in reviving the
old trademark sound of E.L.O." In his retrospective review, AllMusic's Doug Stone noted the album as "a decent fabrication of a begone fab era".

Track listing
Original LP

Tracks included on 2021 reissue:

Personnel 
Personnel according to the booklet.
ELO Part II
Bev Bevan – drums, percussion
Eric Troyer – keyboards, backing vocals, lead vocals (A1, A2, B1, B2, B4)
Peter Haycock – guitars, bass, backing vocals, lead vocals (A4, B5)
Neil Lockwood – lead vocals (A3, A5, B3), backing vocals

Additional personnel
Louis Clark – string arrangements
Mik Kaminski – violin (on "Heartbreaker")
Jeff Glixman – producer
Don Arden – executive producer
Mark Derryberry – engineer
Jonathan Miller – engineer
Alison Leaberry-Smith - engineer
John Etchels - engineer
Bob Norberg – editing
Kevin Reeves – editing
Wally Traugott – mastering
Ron McPherson – art, graphics, design

Charts

References

1991 debut albums
ELO Part II albums
Albums produced by Jeff Glixman
Scotti Brothers Records albums